Phin Glynn is a British film and television producer and writer. He is best known as co-creator and producer of Staged, which premiered on BBC One.

In 2018, he formed Infinity Hill alongside Axel Kuschevatzky and Cindy Teperman.

Filmography

Publications 
 2021 - Completely Staged

Awards and nominations

References

External links
 

Living people
British television directors
British film producers
British television writers
Year of birth missing (living people)